Propatria is a Caracas Metro station on Line 1. It was opened on 2 January 1983 as part of the inaugural section of Line 1 between Propatria and La Hoyada, and is located on Avenida 2 de Propatria. It serves as the western terminus of the line. The following station is Pérez Bonalde. Trains run from the station every three minutes.

Since December 2019, the metro line has faced technical issues, frequently reducing service to the station.

References

External links 
 

Caracas Metro stations
1983 establishments in Venezuela
Railway stations opened in 1983